LGBT+ Conservatives is an organisation for LGBT conservatism in the United Kingdom. It is affiliated and is the official LGBT wing of the Conservative Party. The current advocacy group can trace its roots back to the Conservative Group for Homosexual Equality which was later renamed the Tory Campaign for Homosexual Equality. The group was eventually disbanded and the new LGBTory group was formed, changing its name in 2016 to LGBT+ Conservatives.

The group campaigns for LGBT rights alongside the main political beliefs and policies of the Conservative Party, which it promotes within the Party, LGBT community, and wider public. Besides this LGBT+ Conservatives campaigns for LGBT candidates, including through its Candidates' Fund and attends Pride events across the country. It also organises events related to LGBT rights including an annual event with Stonewall at Conservative Party Conference. Since its early formation, the organisation has had an impact nationally, within Europe and globally becoming the model and inspiration for LGBTory and alike groups in Australia and Canada.

Activity

LGBT+ Conservatives has been present at social meet ups, meals and drinks and Pride events across the country. LGBT+ Conservatives host many fundraising events across the UK, and Parliamentary receptions in The Palace of Westminster for members of both the House of Lords and House of Commons. LGBT+ Conservatives' officers also represented the organisation at the then-Prime Minister Theresa May's LGBT Downing Street garden reception.

After the 2017 general election, the group's then-chair Matthew Green was critical of the Democratic Unionist Party, describing the DUP's record on LGBT issues as "appalling". This followed May's announcement that she intended to form a minority government with the DUP. As a result of the hung Parliament arising from the election, May's Conservatives did not have an overall majority, so were reliant on DUP support to govern. The Conservative-DUP agreement was finalised several weeks later, and lasted until Parliament was dissolved in November 2019.

In 2018, the official LGBT+ Conservative account posted a tweet denouncing the views of Conservative MP David Davies on trans people. It later apologised for the tone of the tweet.

Fund
LGBT+ Conservatives group disburse campaign funds in support of LGBT+ candidates.

Chairmanship
 2007–2008: Anastasia Beaumont–Bott
 2008–2009: Edward Butler–Ellis 
 2009–2013: Cllr Matthew Sephton
 2013–2017: Colm Howard–Lloyd
 2017–2018: Matthew Green - Resigned 14 May 2018
 2018–2019: John Cope - Interim Chairman 
2019–2020: Colm Howard-Lloyd
2020–present: Elena Bunbury

Patrons
LGBT+ Conservatives patrons:

 Stuart Andrew MP
Lord Black of Brentwood
 Crispin Blunt MP
 Andrew Boff AM
 Rt Hon. Baroness Davidson of Lundin Links
 Peter Gibson MP
 Lord Ian Duncan
 Nigel Evans MP
 Mike Freer MP
 Lord Robert Hayward
 Iain Stewart MP
Gary Sambrook MP
 Annie Wells MSP
 William Wragg MP
 Rt Hon. David Mundell MP
 Elliot Colburn MP
 Lee Rowley MP
 Mark Fletcher MP
 Andy Street
 Jamie Green MSP

See also

List of organisations associated with the British Conservative Party
List of LGBT-related organisations
LGBT rights in the United Kingdom

References

LGBT conservatism
LGBT political advocacy groups in the United Kingdom
Organisations associated with the Conservative Party (UK)
2006 establishments in the United Kingdom
LGBT affiliate organizations of political parties
2016 in British politics
Conservative Party (UK) donors